The Reawakening is the fifth and final album by the band The Berzerker released in 2008. This was the first album by the band not to be sold in stores after the band left Earache Records.

Personnel 
 Luke Kenny – Vocals, drum programming, synth, samples
 Ed Lacey – Guitar, Bass
 Martin Germ Bermheden – guitar

Live 
 Luke Kenny – vocals
 Todd Hansen – drums
 Damien Palmer – bass
 Ed Lacey – guitar
 Martin Germ Bermheden – guitar
 Tim Aldridge – guitar

Track listing
"Wisdom and Corruption" – 3:50
"Unforgotten Force" – 5:17
"Caught in the Crossfire" – 3:21
"The Deception" - 4:02
"Disassembly Line" – 3:27
"Evolution of Aggression" – 3:26
"Your Final Seconds" – 2:59
"Harvesting a Loved One" – 3:35
"Internal Examination" – 3:07
"Spare Parts" – 3:15
"Spare Parts" (Namshubofenki Mix)* – 3:27
"Spare Parts" (Bazooka Mix)* - 4:23
"Caught In The Crossfire" (Zardonic Mix)* - 3:38	
"Spare Parts" (Delta 9 Mix)* - 2:36
"Caught In The Crossfire" (Stanley Cupid Mix)* - 4:02
"Spare Parts" (Frazzbass Mix)* - 4:09

 *Bonus tracks available exclusively in the Digipak Edition

A music video was created for "Internal Examination".

Reception 
Thrash Hits    link

References 

2008 albums
The Berzerker albums